The Rouvre is a river in Normandy, in the Orne département, a tributary of the river Orne.

The river's source is in the commune of Beauvain, a few kilometres to the east of La Ferté-Macé. After crossing the Pays d'Houlme, it turns in a north-westerly direction to re-enter Norman Switzerland, and then in its last course of  passes around Bréel.

The Rouvre then joins the Orne between the dam at Saint-Philbert-sur-Orne and Pont-d'Ouilly, and joins the Orne at Rouvrou (elevation ).

This last part of its course is through small wooded gorges and its fast waters can make for good kayaking, when the water level permits, and fishing for brown trout. These gorges are home to animal and plant species such as pearl mussels and Osmond Royal (water-fern),
and one may occasionally see otters and salmon.

References

External links
 Page about the Rouvre, on a kayaking website
 Description of the Rock of Oetre, on the website of the Council-General of Orne
 CPIE des Collines normandes Association of environmental education, based at the Rouvre waterside, on the website of the 'House of River and Countryside'

Rivers of Normandy
Rivers of France
Rivers of Orne